Krishnadevaraya Halt railway station (station code: KNDV) is an Indian Railways Train station located in  Attiguppe, Bangalore  in the Indian state of Karnataka which is located about 5 km away from the .  This station serves the Attiguppe, RPC layout, Baapuji Nagara, Deepanjalinagara, and Vijayanagara areas of Bangalore city.

Structure and expansion
Krishnadevaraya halt has two platforms each running to 400m in length, shelters, lighting, benches and a booking office felicity available.

See also
 Mysore–Bangalore railway line

References

Railway stations in Bangalore Urban district
Railway stations in Bangalore
Bangalore railway division